Elections for the New South Wales Legislative Assembly were held in the state of New South Wales, Australia, on Saturday 17 November 1973. The result was a win for the Liberal-Country Party coalition under Sir Robert Askin, which had been in office since 1965. As of 2023, this was the last time the Coalition won a fourth-term in New South Wales.

Issues 
The Legislative Assembly had been enlarged by three members to 99 adding the seats of Woronora, Penrith and Ku-ring-gai.

The election was held just eleven months after the Liberal/Country coalition lost the federal election after 23 years in power. Askin called an early election to take advantage of the increasing economic issues which had been attributed to the Whitlam Labor government.

Leader of the Legislative Council Neville Wran, who would become Premier at the next election moved from the unelected Legislative Council to the Legislative Assembly after the late retirement of Clarrie Earl in the seat of Bass Hill.

Key dates

Results 

The Democratic Labor Party won its only lower house seat at the 1973 election following the Liberal Party's incumbent for the northern Sydney seat of Gordon — Harry Jago failed to nominate in time. Conservative voters were urged to vote for the DLP candidate, Kevin Harrold.

{{Australian elections/Title row
| table style = float:right;clear:right;margin-left:1em;
| title        = New South Wales state election, 17 November 1973
| house        = Legislative Assembly
| series       = New South Wales state election
| back         = 1971
| forward      = 1976
| enrolled     = 2,767,876
| total_votes  = 2,560,653
| turnout %    = 92.51
| turnout chg  = -0.75
| informal     = 69,225
| informal %   = 2.70
| informal chg = +0.36
}}

|}

{{ bar box |float=right| title=Popular vote | titlebar=#ddd | width=600px | barwidth=410px | bars= 

}}

Seats changing hands

 Members listed in italics did not recontest their seats.
 Sitting Liberal MP for Gordon, Harry Jago failed to renominate as a candidate by the deadline. As a result, the Liberal party endorsed the DLP candidate against the Labor candidate, and Kevin Harrold won the seat.
 In addition, the Liberal party held the seat of Murray, which it had won from an Independent in the 1973 by-election.

Redistribution affected seats

 Members listed in italics did not recontest their seats.
 Sitting Labor member for Gosford, Keith O'Connell instead contested the new seat of Peats and won.
 Sitting Labor member for Nepean, Ron Mulock instead contested the new seat of Penrith and won.

Post-election pendulum

 The results for Coogee was based on the result of the by-election that was held as a result of the decision by the Court of Disputed Returns due to the closeness off the result for the electorate at the 1973 election.

See also
Candidates of the 1973 New South Wales state election

Notes

References

Elections in New South Wales
1973 elections in Australia
1970s in New South Wales
November 1973 events in Australia